Gastroplakaeis schultzei is a moth species in the family of Lasiocampidae found in Nigeria.

Related pages
List of moths of Nigeria

References
Archive.org: Aurivillius, C. 1905b. Lieutnant A. Schultze's Sammlung von Lepidopteren aus West-Afrika. - Arkiv för Zoologi 2(12):1–47, pls. 1–5.

External links

Moths described in 1905
Lasiocampinae
Moths of Africa